Gerhard Thurow (2 November 1934 – 11 April 1976 in Tilburg) was a former Grand Prix motorcycle road racer from Germany. His best years were in 1974 and 1975 when he finished both seasons in fourth place in the 50cc world championship. On 11 April 1976, Thurow died in a crash during a race in Tilburg.

References 

1934 births
1976 deaths
German motorcycle racers
50cc World Championship riders
Motorcycle racers who died while racing
Sport deaths in the Netherlands
Place of birth missing